The National Unity of Hope (UNE) is a political party in Guatemala. It was founded in 2002 and defines itself as a social-democratic and social-Christian party. It is the largest political party in Guatemala by the number of members.

2003 election

At the legislative elections held on November 9, 2003, the party won 17.9% of the popular vote and 32 out of 158 seats in Congress. Its presidential candidate Álvaro Colom won 26.4% in the presidential elections on the same day and was defeated in the second round, when he received 45.9%.

2007 election

For the 2007 elections, the party again chose Colom as its presidential candidate. He came in first place with 28% of the vote; 
in the Legislative Election, the party won 22.8% of the vote and 48 seats in Congress, more than any other party. On November 4, 2007, in the second round of the election, Colom was elected President of Guatemala. It would mark the first time since 1954 that Guatemala had a left wing government.

2011 election

In the 2011 elections, the Constitutional Court ruled out the candidacy of Colom's ex-wife, Sandra Torres, thus making it the first time in the history of the elections that an official ruling party did not present presidential and vice-presidential candidacies.

2015 election

In the 2015 elections held on September 6, 2015, the National Unity of Hope won 19.76% of the vote in the first round and 27 seats in Congress. In the second round (run-off) Presidential candidate Sandra Torres placed second in the presidential race with 32.56% of the vote, eventually losing in the October 25 run-off to Jimmy Morales of the National Convergence Front (FCN/Nation).

2019 election

In the 2019 elections held on June 16, 2019, the party again chose Sandra Torres as its presidential candidate. She came in first place in the first round with 25.54% of the vote but lost the second round on August 11, 2019 with 42.05% of the vote to Alejandro Giammattei of the Vamos party; in the Legislative Election, the UNE party won 54 seats in Congress, more than any other party.

2023 election

The National Unity of Hope had an internal division between deputies opponents and supporters of Sandra Torres in 2020, caused by Torres's accusations of corruption and poor electoral results in 2019, as well as her support for the government of Alejandro Giammattei. A faction opposing Torres removed her as leader and expelled her from the party in 2021. However, the Supreme Electoral Tribunal ruled in favor of Torres and allowed her to continue as party leader. A few days after the decision of the electoral court, the opposition group to Sandra Torres announced its resignation from the National Unity of Hope, to found the "Parliamentary Opposition Group", in reference to its parliamentary opposition to the Giammattei government.

The Parliamentary Opposition Group approached the Will, Opportunity and Solidarity political party.

Election results

President of the Republic of Guatemala

Congress of the Republic

Notable UNE Congressmen

Notes

References

External links
 

2002 establishments in Guatemala
Christian political parties
Full member parties of the Socialist International
Political parties established in 2002
Political parties in Guatemala
Social democratic parties in North America
Socialist parties in Guatemala